The results of the 2016 Little League World Series was determined between August 18 and August 28, 2016 in South Williamsport, Pennsylvania. 16 teams were divided into two groups, one with eight teams from the United States and another with eight international teams, with both groups playing a modified double-elimination tournament. In each group, the last remaining undefeated team faced the last remaining team with one loss, with the winners of those games advancing to play for the Little League World Series championship.

Double-elimination stage

United States

Winner's bracket

Game 2: New York 7, Rhode Island 2

Game 4: Tennessee 3, Oregon 2

Game 6: Iowa 5, California 1

Game 8: Kentucky 11, Texas 1

Game 14: New York 3, Tennessee 1

Game 16: Kentucky 14, Iowa 4

Game 24: New York 13, Kentucky 10

Loser's bracket

Game 10: Rhode Island 8, Oregon 0

Game 12: California 5, Texas 0

Game 18: Iowa 3, Rhode Island 2

Game 20: Tennessee 4, California 2

Game 22: Tennessee 14, Iowa 3

Game 26: Tennessee 8, Kentucky 4

International

Winner's bracket

Game 1: Panama 10, Mexico 2

Game 3: Australia 3, Italy 1

Game 5: Canada 10, Japan 4

Game 7: South Korea 3, Curaçao 0

Game 13: Panama 3, Australia 2

Game 15: South Korea 10, Canada 0

Game 23: Panama 3, South Korea 2

Loser's bracket

Game 9: Mexico 12, Italy 7

Game 11: Curaçao 2, Japan 1

Game 17: Mexico 7, Canada 1

Game 19: Australia 2, Curaçao 1

Game 21: Mexico 10, Australia 0

Game 25: South Korea 7, Mexico 0

Consolation games

Game A: Oregon 6, Italy 2

Game B: Japan 6, Texas 1

Single-elimination stage

International championship: South Korea 7, Panama 2

United States championship: New York 4, Tennessee 2

Third place game: Panama 3, Tennessee 2

World championship game: New York 2, South Korea 1

References

External links
Full schedule from littleleague.org 

2016 Little League World Series